In mathematics, the discrete-time Fourier transform (DTFT), also called the finite Fourier transform, is a form of Fourier analysis that is applicable to a sequence of values.

The DTFT is often used to analyze samples of a continuous function.  The term discrete-time refers to the fact that the transform operates on discrete data, often samples whose interval has units of time.  From uniformly spaced samples it produces a function of frequency that is a periodic summation of the continuous Fourier transform of the original continuous function.  Under certain theoretical conditions, described by the sampling theorem, the original continuous function can be recovered perfectly from the DTFT and thus from the original discrete samples.  The DTFT itself is a continuous function of frequency, but discrete samples of it can be readily calculated via the discrete Fourier transform (DFT) (see ), which is by far the most common method of modern Fourier analysis.

Both transforms are invertible.  The inverse DTFT is the original sampled data sequence.  The inverse DFT is a periodic summation of the original sequence.  The fast Fourier transform (FFT) is an algorithm for computing one cycle of the DFT, and its inverse produces one cycle of the inverse DFT.

Definition 
The discrete-time Fourier transform of a discrete sequence of real or complex numbers , for all integers , is a Trigonometric series, which produces a periodic function of a frequency variable.

The discrete-time Fourier transform is analogous to a Fourier series, except instead of starting with a periodic function of time and producing discrete sequence over frequency, it starts with a discrete sequence in time and produces a periodic function in frequency. The utility of this frequency domain function is rooted in the Poisson summation formula.

So  comprises exact copies of  that are shifted by multiples of  hertz and combined by addition. For sufficiently large  the  term can be observed in the region  with little or no distortion (aliasing) from the other terms. In Fig.1, the extremities of the distribution in the upper left corner are masked by aliasing in the periodic summation (lower left).

Therefore, an alternative definition of DTFT is:

The modulated Dirac comb function is a mathematical abstraction sometimes referred to as impulse sampling.

Inverse transform 
An operation that recovers the discrete data sequence from the DTFT function is called an inverse DTFT.  For instance, the inverse continuous Fourier transform of both sides of  produces the sequence in the form of a modulated Dirac comb function:

However, noting that  is periodic, all the necessary information is contained within any interval of length . The standard formulas for the Fourier coefficients are also the inverse transforms:

Periodic data 
When the input data sequence  is -periodic,  can be computationally reduced to a discrete Fourier transform (DFT), because:
 All the available information is contained within  samples.
At those frequencies, the DTFT diverges at different frequency-dependent rates. And those rates are given by the DFT of one cycle of the  sequence.
 The DTFT is periodic, so the maximum number of unique harmonic amplitudes is 

The DFT coefficients are given by:

     and the DTFT is:

      

Substituting this expression into the inverse transform formula confirms:

 (all integers)

as expected.  The inverse DFT in the line above is sometimes referred to as a Discrete Fourier series (DFS).

Sampling the DTFT 
When the DTFT is continuous, a common practice is to compute an arbitrary number of samples of one cycle of the periodic function : 

where  is a periodic summation:

     (see Discrete Fourier series)

The  sequence is the inverse DFT.  Thus, our sampling of the DTFT causes the inverse transform to become periodic.  The array of  values is known as a periodogram, and the parameter  is called NFFT in the Matlab function of the same name.

In order to evaluate one cycle of  numerically, we require a finite-length  sequence.  For instance, a long sequence might be truncated by a window function of length  resulting in three cases worthy of special mention.  For notational simplicity, consider the  values below to represent the values modified by the window function.

Case: Frequency decimation.  , for some integer  (typically 6 or 8)

A cycle of  reduces to a summation of  segments of length .  The DFT then goes by various names, such as:
window-presum FFT
Weight, overlap, add (WOLA)

polyphase DFT
polyphase filter bank
multiple block windowing and time-aliasing.

Recall that decimation of sampled data in one domain (time or frequency) produces overlap (sometimes known as aliasing) in the other, and vice versa.  Compared to an -length DFT, the  summation/overlap causes decimation in frequency, leaving only DTFT samples least affected by spectral leakage.  That is usually a priority when implementing an FFT filter-bank (channelizer).  With a conventional window function of length , scalloping loss would be unacceptable.  So multi-block windows are created using FIR filter design tools.   Their frequency profile is flat at the highest point and falls off quickly at the midpoint between the remaining DTFT samples.  The larger the value of parameter , the better the potential performance.

Case: .

When a symmetric, -length window function is truncated by 1 coefficient it is called periodic or DFT-even. To sample  at the same frequencies, for comparison, the DFT is computed for one cycle of the periodic summation, 

Case: Frequency interpolation.  

In this case, the DFT simplifies to a more familiar form:

In order to take advantage of a fast Fourier transform algorithm for computing the DFT, the summation is usually performed over all  terms, even though  of them are zeros.  Therefore, the case  is often referred to as zero-padding.

Spectral leakage, which increases as  decreases, is detrimental to certain important performance metrics, such as resolution of multiple frequency components and the amount of noise measured by each DTFT sample.  But those things don't always matter, for instance when the  sequence is a noiseless sinusoid (or a constant), shaped by a window function.  Then it is a common practice to use zero-padding to graphically display and compare the detailed leakage patterns of window functions.  To illustrate that for a rectangular window, consider the sequence:

 and 

Figures 2 and 3 are plots of the magnitude of two different sized DFTs, as indicated in their labels.  In both cases, the dominant component is at the signal frequency: .  Also visible in Fig 2 is the spectral leakage pattern of the  rectangular window.  The illusion in Fig 3 is a result of sampling the DTFT at just its zero-crossings.  Rather than the DTFT of a finite-length sequence, it gives the impression of an infinitely long sinusoidal sequence.  Contributing factors to the illusion are the use of a rectangular window, and the choice of a frequency (1/8 = 8/64) with exactly 8 (an integer) cycles per 64 samples.  A Hann window would produce a similar result, except the peak would be widened to 3 samples (see DFT-even Hann window).

Convolution 

The convolution theorem for sequences is:

An important special case is the circular convolution of sequences  and  defined by  where  is a periodic summation.  The discrete-frequency nature of  means that the product with the continuous function  is also discrete, which results in considerable simplification of the inverse transform:

The significance of this result is explained at Circular convolution and Fast convolution algorithms.

Symmetry properties 
When the real and imaginary parts of a complex function are decomposed into their even and odd parts, there are four components, denoted below by the subscripts RE, RO, IE, and IO.  And there is a one-to-one mapping between the four components of a complex time function and the four components of its complex frequency transform:

From this, various relationships are apparent, for example:
The transform of a real-valued function is the even symmetric function .  Conversely, an even-symmetric transform implies a real-valued time-domain.
The transform of an imaginary-valued function is the odd symmetric function , and the converse is true.
The transform of an even-symmetric function is the real-valued function , and the converse is true.
The transform of an odd-symmetric function is the imaginary-valued function , and the converse is true.

Relationship to the Z-transform 
 is a Fourier series that can also be expressed in terms of the bilateral Z-transform.  I.e.:

where the  notation distinguishes the Z-transform from the Fourier transform.  Therefore, we can also express a portion of the Z-transform in terms of the Fourier transform:

The terms of  remain a constant width and their separation  scales up or down.

Table of discrete-time Fourier transforms 
Some common transform pairs are shown in the table below.  The following notation applies:

 is a real number representing continuous angular frequency (in radians per sample). In all cases in the table, the DTFT is 2π-periodic (in ).
Then: 
  is the Dirac delta function
   is the normalized sinc function
 
  is the triangle function
  is an integer representing the discrete-time domain (in samples)
  is the discrete-time unit step function
  is the Kronecker delta

Properties
This table shows some mathematical operations in the time domain and the corresponding effects in the frequency domain.
  is the discrete convolution of two sequences

See also
 Least-squares spectral analysis
 Multidimensional transform
 Zak transform

Notes

Page citations

References

Further reading

Transforms
Fourier analysis
Digital signal processing